Tommaso Misciroli (1636–1699) was an Italian painter of the Baroque period. Also called il Pittor Villano or the Peasant Painter. Born in Faenza. He studied the work of Guido Reni. In Faenza, he painted a Martyrdom of Saint Cecilia for the church of namesake in Faenza.

References

1636 births
1699 deaths
People from Faenza
17th-century Italian painters
Italian male painters
Italian Baroque painters